Stainville is an unincorporated community in Anderson County, Tennessee, United States. It was also known as Ligias and Ligias Fork. Tennessee State Route 116 passes through the community.

Notes

Unincorporated communities in Anderson County, Tennessee
Unincorporated communities in Tennessee